Lowe Parish is a civil Parish of Napier County, New South Wales.

The parish is on the Coolaburragundy River and the economy is based on agriculture.

History 
Before European settlement the surrounding area was occupied by the Gamilaroi and Wiradjuri peoples.

Allan Cunningham was the first British explorer to the area in 1823 while travelling to Pandoras Pass (in the parish) and over the Warrumbungle ranges to the Liverpool Plains.

References

Localities in New South Wales
Central West (New South Wales)